Bashir Ahmad Sarban (Urdu: بشیر احمد) (c. 1913 – 15 August 1992) was an impoverished Pakistani camel cart driver, who, on 20 May 1961, met with the then US vice-president Lyndon B Johnson, and accepted an invitation to come to America.

Invitation
Lyndon Johnson was in Karachi, Pakistan on behalf of President Kennedy as part of a goodwill mission, it was here that he met Bashir Ahmad in a group of camel drivers on a roadside. He pressed the flesh even patting the camels. He used a phrase he had regularly said in his travels, "Y'all come to Washington and see us sometime" but was completely surprised when the illiterate camel driver accepted his offer. With the press hot on his heels after the acceptance, the vice-president took advantage of the People-to-People program to fund the Pakistani's travel expenses.

Another account indicates that Bashir was invited to the Vice President's ranch and that the surprise came not at the time (at least from her point of view), but the next day in the press. Ibrahim Jalis, a popular columnist in Pakistan, reported that everyone was excited by the fact that the vice president had invited Bashir to come to America. Perhaps, he had made the above reported statement while shaking Bashir's hand, leading to the misunderstanding that he had been invited. His column was favorable to Johnson, and contained the quote, "Don't conquer a country, don't conquer a government. If you wish to conquer, conquer the hearts of the people."

State visit
Bashir was personally greeted by vice-president Johnson on his arrival in New York City, Bashir was then invited to Johnson's private ranch in Texas. During his week stay, the Pakistani was also taken to Kansas City, where he met ex-president Harry S Truman, who referred to him as 'your excellency', as well as to Washington D.C., where he was taken to the Lincoln Memorial, the Senate Floor, and to President Kennedy's office.

Finally, at the end of his stay, as a gesture of further goodwill, vice-president Johnson made arrangements for Bashir to visit the Islamic holy city of Mecca on his return to Pakistan. This act of friendship brought tears to the eyes of the destitute camel driver.

References

1910s births
1970s deaths
Baloch people
Lyndon B. Johnson
Camel drivers
People from Karachi
Pakistan–United States relations